The 2014 NRL Auckland Nines (known as the Dick Smith NRL Auckland Nines due to sponsorship) was the first NRL Auckland Nines tournament, contested between all sixteen teams of the National Rugby League. The draw was released on 30 October 2014. It was a two-day, nine-a-side, knockout tournament held at Eden Park in Auckland, New Zealand. All sixteen NRL clubs and 256 players competed over the one weekend (February 15 – February 16) with AUD$2.25 million prize money split between the teams. The North Queensland Cowboys won the tournament defeating the Brisbane Broncos 16 – 7.

Tournament Games

Yellow pool

Green pool

Blue pool

Red pool

Finals

Players

Team of the Tournament

Brisbane Broncos

Canberra Raiders

Canterbury-Bankstown Bulldogs

Cronulla-Sutherland Sharks

Gold Coast Titans

Manly-Warringah Sea Eagles

Melbourne Storm

Newcastle Knights

North Queensland Cowboys

Parramatta Eels

Penrith Panthers

South Sydney Rabbitohs

St. George Illawarra Dragons

Sydney Roosters

New Zealand Warriors

Wests Tigers

Jillaroos

Kiwi Ferns

References

External links
 Official Website
 Live Scores

NRL Auckland Nines
Rugby league in Auckland
North Queensland Cowboys
Auckland Nines